Keydmedia Online is an independently operated news agency based in Mogadishu, Somalia.

Programs

Keydmedia Online aims to present objective news on Somalia to domestic and international readers through articles, editorials and audiovisual materials.

Emphasis is placed on interviews with local politicians on the country's direction. Through its global network of experienced journalists, the organization also strives to provide broad-based coverage and adhere to the ethics of journalism.

It presents news in Somali and English.

Management
Keydmedia Online was founded in 2010 by Somali filmmaker Ali Said Hassan. It is dedicated to the Somali community worldwide.

See also
Media of Somalia

References

External links

2010 establishments in Somalia
Mass media in Mogadishu